Welcome to the Family, Baby is the second album released by the rock and roll jam band The Big Wu.

Track listing
 "Howl Chant" 
 "Break of Day" 
 "Shantytown" 
 "Midnight Rudy" 
 "House of Wu" 
 "Angie O'Plasty" 
 "Werewolves of London" 
 "Parade Drums" 
 "Red Sky"

1999 albums
The Big Wu albums